"Stuck in Love" is a song recorded by American country music duo the Judds.  It was released in February 2000 as a single from Big Bang Boogie, a bonus EP included with Wynonna Judd's 2000 album New Day Dawning. The song peaked at number 26 on the Billboard Hot Country Singles chart and reached number 16 on the RPM Country Tracks chart in Canada.  The song was written by Kim Patton-Johnston and Gary Nicholson.

Chart performance

References

2000 singles
The Judds songs
Curb Records singles
Mercury Records singles
Songs written by Gary Nicholson
2000 songs
Songs written by Kim McLean